Nils Sjöblom (29 January 1910 – 11 May 1993) was a Finnish épée, foil and sabre fencer. He competed at the 1948 and 1952 Summer Olympics.

References

1910 births
1993 deaths
Finnish male épée fencers
Olympic fencers of Finland
Fencers at the 1948 Summer Olympics
Fencers at the 1952 Summer Olympics
Sportspeople from Helsinki
Finnish male foil fencers
Finnish male sabre fencers